Corrinne is a given name. Notable people with the name include:

Corrinne May (born 1973), Singaporean Catholic musician, singer, and songwriter
Corrinne Morrison Cliborne, usually known as Lindy Boggs (1916–2013), member of the U.S. House of Representatives
Corrinne Mudd Brooks (1914–2008), American activist
Corrinne Prevost, Canadian Action Party candidate in the 2004 Canadian federal election
Corrinne Wicks (born 1968), English actress, known for parts in the BBC soap opera Doctors and in the ITV soap opera Emmerdale
Corrinne Yu, Hong Kong-American game programmer

Fictional Characters
Corrinne Balsom, on the American daytime drama One Life to Live

See also
CORIN
Corin
Corinne (disambiguation)
Corrin
Corrine (disambiguation)